MI9, the British Directorate of Military Intelligence Section 9, was a highly secret department of the War Office between 1939 and 1945. During World War II it had two principal tasks: (1) assisting in the escape of Allied prisoners of war (POWs) held by the Axis countries, especially Nazi Germany; and (2) helping Allied military personnel, especially downed airmen, evade capture after they were shot down or trapped behind enemy lines in Axis-occupied countries. During World War II, about 35,000 Allied military personnel, many helped by MI9, escaped POW camps or evaded capture and made their way to Allied or neutral countries after being trapped behind enemy lines.

The best-known activity of MI9 was creating and supporting escape and evasion lines, especially in France and Belgium, which helped 5,000 downed British, American and other Allied airmen evade capture and return to duty. The usual routes of escape from occupied Europe were either south to Switzerland or to southern France and then over the Pyrenees to neutral Spain and Portugal. MI9 trained Allied soldiers and airmen in tactics for evading and escaping and helped prisoners of war to escape by establishing clandestine communications and providing escape devices to them.

Origin 

MI9 officially came into being on 23 December 1939, led by Major (later Brigadier) Norman Crockatt, formerly of The Royal Scots (The Royal Regiment). In December 1941, a sub-section of MI9 became a separate department, MI19. At first MI9 was located in Room 424 of the Metropole Hotel, Northumberland Avenue, London. With limited space at the Metropole, a floor was also taken at the requisitioned Great Central Hotel, opposite Marylebone station, where World War II prison-camp escapees were debriefed and questioned about their journey home. After a German bomb caused slight damage to the Metropole Hotel in September 1940,  Crockatt moved MI9 to a large country house, Wilton Park, Beaconsfield, Buckinghamshire.

MI9 initially received little financial support and was understaffed due to power struggles and personality clashes with MI6, the "oldest and grandest" of the British secret services. The assistant-head of MI6 was Claude Dansey, known as ACSS. Dansey maintained on behalf of MI6 considerable control over MI9, especially not wishing the upstart secret services such as MI9, the Special Operations Executive (SOE), and the Political Warfare Executive (PWE) to compete or interfere with the intelligence gathering function of MI6.

Two posthumously well-known sections of MI9 are Intelligence School 9, section d, known as IS9(d) or "Room 900,"  and "Q." Room 900 was staffed by James Langley and Airey Neave (code named "Saturday") who joined MI9 in 1941 and 1942 respectively. Both were soldiers who had escaped from German captivity. Langley and Neave were concerned with creating and supporting escape and evasion lines in Europe. "Q," staffed by Christopher Hutton and Charles Fraser-Smith, was charged with inventing devices to aid soldiers to evade or escape capture. "Q" was made famous in fiction by the James Bond movies.

Escape lines
Escape lines for Allied soldiers and airmen stranded behind enemy lines were created after the Dunkirk evacuation in June 1940. Most of the British soldiers left behind were captured or surrendered, but about 1,000 soldiers stranded in France declined to surrender, evaded capture by the Germans, and eventually made their way back to Britain with the help of escape lines.  Initially, escape lines were created and financed by the citizenry of France and Belgium who opposed the German occupation of their countries.

Many of the stranded soldiers made their way to Marseilles in Vichy France, theoretically independent but a puppet state of Nazi Germany. Residents of Marseille created the Pat O'Leary Line to help the British soldiers in Marseilles escape to neutral Spain, either by boat or by crossing the Pyrenees on foot. In July 1940, MI9 sent a young man named Donald Darling (code named "Sunday") to Spain and Portugal to help the fledging Pat line exfiltrate soldiers from France to Spain. In Nazi-occupied Belgium, Belgians created the Comet Line. MI9 became aware of Comet in September 1941 when a young woman, Andrée de Jongh, appeared unknown and unannounced at the British Consulate in Bilbao with a British soldier in tow who she had guided through German-occupied France all the way from Belgium. She promised to bring more soldiers if MI9 paid the Comet Line's expenses. A British diplomat, Michael Creswell (code named "Monday"), became the chief contact of the Comet Line in Spain.

Working for the escape lines was arguably the most dangerous resistance activity in Europe and about one-half of the "helpers" (as they were called) were women, mostly young, who could travel with less difficulty and were less suspicious to the Germans than men. The Comet line initially rejected all MI9 assistance and advice except reimbursement for expenses ($200 to $300 in 1942 U.S. dollars) for each airman or soldier delivered to Spain). The Pat Line received financial assistance from MI9 and also wireless operators from April 1942 for communications between Marseilles and MI9 headquarters.

As Allied bombing of occupied Europe increased in 1942, the emphasis of the escape lines turned to rescuing and exfiltrating airmen who had been shot down or crashed in Nazi-controlled territory. The Germans succeeded in mostly destroying the Pat line and weakening the Comet line and additional lines were created, sometimes at the initiative of MI9. MI9 created the Shelburne Escape Line which exfiltrated downed airmen by boat from the coast of Brittany to England and in Operation Marathon set up a secret camp to shelter downed airmen in a remote forest until they could be rescued by Allied forces after the successful Normandy invasion of France.

Middle East 
In late 1940, Lieutenant Colonel (later Brigadier) Dudley Clarke arrived in Cairo at the request of Commander-in-Chief, Middle East, General Sir Archibald Wavell. Clarke's main role was to manage military deception in the region. As cover for this secret mission, he was also assigned the job of managing MI9's presence in the Middle East. After Clarke set up his 'A' Force deception department this cover was extended to the entire office; and for a while 'A' Force represented MI9 in the region until later in the war when the two became separate once again.

Escape aids 

MI9 manufactured various escape aids that they sent to prisoner-of-war camps. Many of them were based on the ideas of Christopher Hutton. Hutton proved so popular that he built himself a secret underground bunker in the middle of a field where he could work in peace.

Hutton made compasses that were hidden inside pens or tunic buttons. He used left-hand threads so that, if the Germans discovered them and the searcher tried to screw them open, they would just tighten. He printed maps on silk, so they would not rustle, and disguised them as handkerchiefs, hiding them inside canned goods. For aircrew he designed special boots with detachable leggings that could quickly be converted to look like civilian shoes, and hollow heels that contained packets of dried food. A magnetised razor blade would indicate north if placed on water. Some of the spare uniforms that were sent to prisoners could be easily converted into civilian suits. Officer prisoners inside Colditz Castle requested and received a complete floor plan of the castle.

Hutton also designed an escaper's knife: a strong blade, a screwdriver, three saws, a lockpick, a forcing tool and a wire cutter.

MI9 used the services of former magician Jasper Maskelyne to design hiding places for escape aids including tools hidden in cricket bats and baseball bats, maps concealed in playing cards and actual money in board-games.  Notably were maps hidden in Monopoly boards, and real money hidden in the piles of monopoly money.

Forged German identity cards, ration coupons and travel warrants were also smuggled into POW camps by MI9.

MI9 sent the tools in parcels in the name of various, usually nonexistent, charity organizations. They did not use Red Cross parcels lest they violate the Geneva Convention and to avoid the guards restricting access to them. MI9 relied upon their parcels either not being searched by the Germans or ensuring that the prisoners (warned by a secret message) could remove the contraband before they were searched. In time the German guards learned to expect and find the escape aids.

The British games manufacturer Jaques of London were commissioned by MI9 to produce a variety of games (from board games to sports) which contained numerous escape and evasion devices. These included travel and full sized chess sets, with contraband inside the wooden boards, the boxes or the chess pieces themselves, table tennis, tennis, badminton racquets containing money, maps and miniature compasses, dart boards filled with escape devices and tools, shove halfpenny boards, hollowed and filled with escape aids, and larger boxed games containing even more contraband. It was not until X-Ray machines were deployed at German POW camps, that the German authorities began to capture significant amounts of escape material.

In southern China the MI9 unit British Army Aid Group helped POWs in Japanese camps escape to China during World War II. The group was closely linked to the Hong Kong Chinese Regiment.

Post War

In 1959 23rd SAS Regiment was formed by re-naming of the Reserve Reconnaissance Unit, successors to MI9.

Notable members 
Peter Baker
Michael Bentine
Charles Fraser-Smith
Christopher Hutton
James Langley
Airey Neave

The Staff of MI9 (At Wilton Park. Beaconsfield, Bucks. February 1940)
Lt. Col. N.R. Crockatt (GSO1)
Lt. Cdr. P.W. Rhodes R.N.
Capt. C Clayton-Hutton (I.O.)
Capt. H.B.A. de Bruyne (I.O.)
Capt. L. Winterbottom 
Flt. Lt. A.J. Evans
Major C.M. Rait (GSO3)
Major V.R. Isham (GSO2)

See also 
British Army Aid Group
Comet Line
Edgard Potier
Escape and evasion lines (World War II)
MI numbers
MIS-X, the US equivalent of MI9
MI High, a British children's TV show from the 2000s about a group of teenagers who work for a modern version of MI9 with different responsibilities
Pat O'Leary Line
Shelburne Escape Line

References

Bibliography

External links 
 MI9 Historical Report
 A Husband's Most Secret War in MI9 IS9

Groups of World War II
Defunct United Kingdom intelligence agencies
1939 establishments in the United Kingdom
Military communications of the United Kingdom
War Office in World War II
British intelligence services of World War II